Wicked City is an EP by English duo Jockstrap. It was released on June 19, 2020, under Warp Records.

Critical reception
Wicked City was met with "generally favourable" reviews from critics. At Metacritic, which assigns a weighted average rating out of 100 to reviews from mainstream publications, this release received an average score of 80, based on 6 reviews. Aggregator Album of the Year gave the album 81 out of 100 based on a critical consensus of 8 reviews.

Track listing

References

2020 EPs
Warp (record label) EPs